31st Cavalry, 31st Cavalry Division or 31st Cavalry Regiment may refer to:

Divisions
 31st Cavalry Division (Soviet Union)

Regiments
 31st Cavalry (Pakistan)
 31st Cavalry Regiment (United States)
 31st Cavalry Regiment (Soviet Union)